Edinho is a Portuguese name, in origin a diminutive form of a forename such as Edison or Edson, both widely used as given names in South America and particularly in Brazil.

Brazilian footballers

Edinho (footballer, born 1955), known as Edino Nazareth Filho, defender
Edinho (footballer, born 1967), full name Edon Amaral Neto, forward
Edinho (footballer, born 1970), full name Edson Cholbi Nascimento, goalkeeper, son of Pelé
Edinho (footballer, born 1974), full name Edoson Silva Martins, midfielder
Edinho (footballer, born 1979), full name Edison Carlos Felícissimo Polidório, left back
Edinho (footballer, born May 1982), full name Éder Luciano, forward
Edinho (footballer, born 1994), full name Francisco Edson Moreira Da Silva, midfielder
Edinho Campos (born 1983), full name Edimo Ferreira Campos, midfielder

Portuguese footballers

Edinho (footballer, born July 1982), full name Arnaldo Edi Lopes da Silva, forward
Edinho Júnior (born 1994), full name Edon Júnior Viegas Amaral, forward